Charles Stanley Rance (28 February 1889 – 29 December 1966) was an English professional footballer who played for Clapton, Tottenham Hotspur, Derby County, Queens Park Rangers and Guildford United.

Football career
Rance won two FA Amateur Cup winners medals with Isthmian League club Clapton, in 1907 and 1909. In the latter final he played alongside Walter Tull in the Clapton forward line.

In 1910, Rance, a centre half joined Tottenham from Clapton. He played a total of 110 matches and scored one goal for the club in all competitions.
Rance moved to Derby County in 1920 where he featured in 23 matches before joining Queens Park Rangers in 1922. He played in 13 matches for the club and ended his career at Guildford United.

In 1924 he went to Hilversum to coach 't Gooi.

References

1889 births
1966 deaths
Footballers from Bow, London
English footballers
Clapton F.C. players
Tottenham Hotspur F.C. players
Derby County F.C. players
Queens Park Rangers F.C. players
Guildford City F.C. players
Isthmian League players
English Football League players
Association football defenders
Expatriate football managers in the Netherlands
English expatriate football managers